The 2012 National Pro Fastpitch season was the ninth season of professional softball under the name National Pro Fastpitch (NPF) for  the only professional women's softball league in the United States.  From 1997 to 2002, NPF operated under the names Women's Pro Fastpitch (WPF) and Women's Pro Softball League (WPSL). The 2012 season is especially notable because due to weather and scheduling issues, the NPF Championship Series was not completed and no Cowles Cup champion was named.

Milestones and events
NPF announced the Carolina Diamonds as a new team for the 2012 season, owned by Amelia Nemeth and husband Alan Demaske .  Carolina replaced the NPF Diamonds, a travelling team operated by NPF.  The team was headquartered in Charlotte, North Carolina and played its home games in various venues throughout the Carolinas.

Teams, cities and stadiums

Player acquisition

College draft

The 2012 NPF College Draft was held in the Peabody Hotel in Memphis, Tennessee on March 7 at 5:00 CST.  USSSA Pride selected pitcher Brittany Mack of LSU as the first overall pick.

Notable transactions

League standings 
Source:

NPF Championship

With only four teams in the league, every team qualified for the postseason. Teams are seeded by the final standings. No. 1 seed USSSA Pride faced No. 4 seed Akron Racers in one best-of-three semifinal series, while the No. 2 seed Chicago Bandits faced the No. 3 seed Carolina Diamonds in another. The winners were scheduled to advance to the best-of-three championship series.

After winning their semifinal series, the Bandits and Pride played the first game of the championship series, with the Bandits winning 2-1.

On Sunday August 26, the start of game was delayed for hours due to rain.  After one out in the first inning, the field was deemed unplayable, and the game was cancelled.  No makeup game was scheduled and the series was ended without naming a champion.

Conflicting comments were made regarding the possibility of finishing the series on Monday.  Citing owners' costs and players' travel obligations, NPF commissioner Cheri Kempf said that "The Bandits had six players that could not change plans, including [starting pitcher] Monica Abbott going to Japan" and,"I can say that the championship wasn't complete, and it wasn't complete because Chicago stated it had six players that could not finish.  So therefore, I don't feel like that the right thing to do is to award the championship on one game." However, Bandits owner Bill Sokolis said,"We could have put nine players on the field,".  On her blog Monica Abbott wrote that no one asked her to change her flight to Japan, but that she "would have done so in a heartbeat."

NPF announced that a committee would be formed to make recommendations to avoid unfinished championships in the future.

Annual awards
On August 22 NPF hosted a banquet in Rosemont, Illinois, at which the league's annual awards were announced and the All-NPF Team was named:

Award notes

See also

 List of professional sports leagues
 List of professional sports teams in the United States and Canada

References

External links 
 

Softball teams
2012 in women's softball
2012 in American women's sports
Softball in the United States